Finnish Football Manager of the Year title has been awarded in Finland since 1981. The nomination is made by Finnish Football Managers' Association.

Finnish Football Managers of the Year

References

See also 
Finnish Footballer of the Year

Association football manager of the year awards
Sport in Finland
Awards established in 1981